Zheduo River, also known as Kangding River, Wasi Creek. It is located in the eastern part of Garzê Tibetan Autonomous Prefecture, Sichuan Province, People's Republic of China, and is a right-bank tributary of the Dadu River. It originates in the southeast of Dawu County, is called the Yala River, flows southeast into the territory of Kangding County, reaches the Lucheng town of Kangding City, turns east after the Yulin River on the right, and joins the Dadu River east of Upper Wasi Village, Guzan Town, Kangding City. The basin belongs to the alpine valley in western Sichuan and is rich in hydraulic resources.

References 

Rivers of Sichuan